Liolaemus thomasi is a species of lizard in the family Iguanidae.  It is from Peru.

References

thomasi
Lizards of South America
Reptiles of Peru
Endemic fauna of Peru
Reptiles described in 1998
Taxa named by Raymond Laurent